Vera Andreevna Kuznetsova (6 October 1907 — 11 December 1994) was a Russian actress. She appeared in more than fifty films from 1944 to 1991.

Selected filmography

References

External links 

1907 births
1994 deaths
Soviet film actresses
Soviet stage actresses
Cannes Film Festival Award for Best Actress winners
Honored Artists of the RSFSR
Actors from Saratov